Pars membranacea may refer to:
Membranous urethra of the male urinary tract
Posterior wall of the human trachea
Upper part of the interventricular septum